Onoja is a Nigerian surname. Notable people with the surname include:

Lawrence Onoja (born 1948), military governor of Plateau State, Nigeria 
Mike Onoja, Nigerian businessman and public administrator 
Ogwu James Onoja (born 1968), Nigerian lawyer and notary 

Surnames of Nigerian origin